Sheffield University F.C. is an English association football club based in Sheffield, South Yorkshire. This football club is amongst the largest sporting clubs at the University of Sheffield.

History

League and cup history

Records
 Best FA Amateur Cup performance - 3rd Qualifying Round, 1929–30
 Best FA Vase performance - 1st Round, 1974–75, 1975–76, 1976–77

References

Football clubs in South Yorkshire
Sports teams and clubs in Sheffield
University and college football clubs in England
Football clubs in England
South Yorkshire Amateur Football League
Yorkshire Football League